Tadateru (written: 忠輝, 忠英 or 忠照) is a masculine Japanese given name. Notable people with the name include:

 (1611–1652), Japanese daimyō
, president of the International Federation of Red Cross and Red Crescent Societies
 (1592–1683), Japanese daimyō
 (1613–1654), Japanese daimyō
 (born 1969), Japanese footballer
 (1665–1716), Japanese daimyō

Japanese masculine given names